Robin Hood Cemetery and Crematorium is located near Shirley, West Midlands, within the Metropolitan Borough of Solihull, in the West Midlands. A cemetery chapel was built in 1931, and the crematorium was built in 1958, including for modifications to the chapel to cater for the cremation facilities.

There are 43 Commonwealth service personnel buried in the cemetery whose graves are registered and maintained by the Commonwealth War Graves Commission, 2 from World War I and 41 from World War II.  A World War I Victoria Cross recipient, Thomas Turrall (1885–1964) is buried here. Janet Parker, a medical photographer who in 1978 became the last person to die from smallpox, was cremated here in accordance with disease control measures.

The cemetery is very nearly full to capacity and the council generally only allows interments in existing graves. There are however above ground vaults, which were constructed in 2005, for cremated remains for which leases are available.

See also
 List of cemeteries in England

References

External links
 
 

Solihull
Cemeteries in the West Midlands (county)